Dallas Select is an American women’s soccer team, founded in 2007. The team is a member of the Women's Premier Soccer League, the third tier of women’s soccer in the United States and Canada. The team plays in the South Division of the Big Sky Conference. Prior to the 2009 season they were known as Vitesse Dallas.

The team plays its home games at Old Panther Field in the city of Duncanville, Texas, 14 miles south-west of downtown Dallas. The club's colors are blue, beige and white.

Players

Current roster

Notable former players

Year-by-year

Honors

Competition history

Coaches
  Robert Podeyn 2008–present

Stadia
 Old Panther Field, Duncanville, Texas 2008–present

Average attendance

External links
 WPSL Vitesse Dallas page

Women's Premier Soccer League teams
Women's soccer clubs in the United States
Select
2007 establishments in Texas
Women's sports in Texas